Elephas iolensis, also spelled Elephas jolensis, is an extinct species of elephant. The type specimen is located in the National Museum of Natural History in Paris. It is only known from isolated molars. The species is known from remains found across Africa (including Algeria, Morocco, Tunisia, South Africa, and Kenya) dating to the late Middle Pleistocene to Late Pleistocene. It was a direct descendant of Elephas recki. They are thought to have been dedicated grazers.

The species is often spelled "Elephas iolensis", however, the original intended spellling appears to be Elephas jolensis. Some authors have used the combination "Palaeoloxodon iolensis", reflecting the inclusion of "E." recki within Palaeoloxodon.

References

Prehistoric proboscideans